Anna Jolanta Sochańska is a Polish diplomat. Since 2019 she has been Ambassador to the Republic of Ireland.

Life 
Sochańska received master's degree from the Institute of Social Prevention and Resocialization at University of Warsaw, writing her thesis about the informal behavior of prisoners in concentration camps. She has been studying also at the College of Europe in Bruges (1993–1994).

In 1991, Sochańska started her professional career at the Ministry of Health, being responsible for international scientific cooperation. In 1994, she worked for the Office of the Council of Ministers, at the office of the Plenipotentiary for European Integration. In 1995, she joined the Ministry of Foreign Affairs. She was a member of the team negotiating the accession of Poland to the European Union, being in charge of foreign and security policy issues and external affairs. In 1997, she served at the embassy in the Hague during the Dutch and Luxembourg EU presidency. Between 2001 and 2006 she was a Counselor for EU matters at the embassy in London. Upon her return to the MFA, Sochańska was the head of the EU enlargement policy division and afterwards – a deputy director for South-Eastern Europe, EU Enlargement and the external aspects of migration. In 2018, she became director of the Department of European Policy. In August 2019, Sochańska was nominated Ambassador Extraordinary and Plenipotentiary of Poland to Ireland. She presented her letter of credence in October 2019 to the President Michael D. Higgins.

In 2014, Sochańska was awarded with Gold Cross of Merit.

References 

1960s births
Ambassadors of Poland to Ireland
Living people
Recipients of the Gold Cross of Merit (Poland)
University of Warsaw alumni
Date of birth missing (living people)
College of Europe alumni
Polish women ambassadors